Pydna is a genus of moths in the family Geometridae erected by Francis Walker in 1856.

Species
Species include:
Pydna albidostriata
Pydna alboflavida
Pydna aurata
Pydna aurata midas
Pydna badiaria
Pydna basistriga
Pydna brunneossticta - moved to Curuzza eburnean
Pydna decurrens
Pydna eburnea
Pydna eupatagia
Pydna fasciata
Pydna ferrifera
Pydna formosicola
Pydna galbana
Pydna griseodivisa
Pydna kamadena
Pydna kamadena orientalis
Pydna longivitta
Pydna mediodivisa
Pydna metaphsea
Pydna nana
Pydna nigrofasciata - moved to Curuzza nigrofasciata
Pydna nigropimetfi
Pydna nigrovittata
Pydna ochracea
Pydna pallida
Pydna pallida bansai
Pydna plusioides
Pydna prominens
Pydna pseudotestacea - moved to Periergos kamadena
Pydna sikkima
Pydna straminea
Pydna straminea harakiri
Pydna suisharyonis - moved to Besaia sordida
Pydna testacea

References

Geometridae